This article lists the largest companies in Poland in terms of their revenue, net profit and total assets, according to the French consulting firm Coface and the American business magazine Forbes.

Largest by revenue 
The 30 largest non-financial companies by revenue in 2017 according to the Coface CEE Top 500.

2019 Forbes list 

This list is based on the Forbes Global 2000, which ranks the world's 2,000 largest publicly traded companies. The Forbes list takes into account a multitude of factors, including the revenue, net profit, total assets and market value of each company; each factor is given a weighted rank in terms of importance when considering the overall ranking. The table below also lists the headquarters location and industry sector of each company. The figures are in billions of US dollars and are for the year 2018. All seven companies from Poland in the Forbes 2000 are listed.

See also 
 List of companies of Poland
 List of largest companies by revenue

References 

Lists of companies of Poland
Poland